Bardu may refer to:

People
 Bardu Ali (1906–1981), an American jazz and R&B singer, guitarist, and promoter

Places
Bardu, a municipality in Troms county, Norway
Bardu Church, a church in Troms county, Norway
Bardu, Iran, a village in Karizan Rural District, Nasrabad District, Torbat-e Jam County, Razavi Khorasan Province, Iran
Bardu, Kyrgyzstan, a village area in Kyrgyzstan

See also 
Bardufoss
Bardu (card game)
Bardo (disambiguation)